Smithfield Township is one of twenty townships in Fayette County, Iowa, USA.  As of the 2010 census, its population was 250.

Geography
According to the United States Census Bureau, Smithfield Township covers an area of 36.09 square miles (93.47 square kilometers).

Adjacent townships
 Westfield Township (north)
 Illyria Township (northeast)
 Fairfield Township (east)
 Putnam Township (southeast)
 Scott Township (south)
 Jefferson Township (southwest)
 Harlan Township (west)
 Center Township (northwest)

Cemeteries
The township contains Garden Prairie Cemetery.

Major highways
  Iowa Highway 150
  Iowa Highway 187

School districts
 North Fayette Valley Community School District
 Starmont Community School District
 West Central Community School District

Political districts
 Iowa's 1st congressional district
 State House District 24
 State Senate District 12

References
 United States Census Bureau 2008 TIGER/Line Shapefiles
 United States Board on Geographic Names (GNIS)
 United States National Atlas

External links
 US-Counties.com
 City-Data.com

Townships in Fayette County, Iowa
Townships in Iowa